Hässleholm (older ) is a locality and the seat of Hässleholm Municipality, Scania County, Sweden with 18,500 inhabitants in 2010.

Overview
Hässleholm was gradually developed from 1860 in connection with the construction of the main Stockholm to Malmö railway line. There was no settlement on the spot before the arrival of the railway. The station got its name from a manor situated in the vicinity of a planned railway junction.  It gained the city title in 1914 and was then classified as one of Sweden's smallest cities. During the 20th century, it developed into a military hub. After the end of the cold war, most of the military establishments were disbanded or moved to other locations.

In 2000, Hässleholm's Cultural Center ("kulturhus") was opened. It features theatres, a library, a visitors center, and restaurants. East of the town center is the hometown park ("hembygdspark") with a statue called "Snapphanen", by the sculptor Axel Ebbe. The statue reminds of the area's history as a center for Scanian insurgents during the 17th-century struggles between Sweden and Denmark.

Some of the town's most interesting and distinctive architecture is located along First Avenue ("Första avenyn"). The Central Train Station is at the west end of the street, in the very heart of the town. Hässleholm's church (built in 1914) lies at the east end of the street. Hotell Statt, the main and oldest hotel, is located on the north side, and on the south side is the town's oldest building, which now holds stores, offices, and apartments.

The Swedish representative for the 2013 Eurovision Song Contest, Robin Stjernberg, was born in Hässleholm in 1991.

Sports
The local sports clubs are:
 Hässleholms IF
 IFK Hässleholm

References

External links 

Official site

Municipal seats of Skåne County
Swedish municipal seats
Populated places in Hässleholm Municipality
Populated places in Skåne County
20th-century establishments in Skåne County